is a Japanese footballer currently playing as a defender for Vanraure Hachinohe.

Career statistics

Club
.

Notes

References

External links

1989 births
Living people
Association football people from Osaka Prefecture
Kindai University alumni
Japanese footballers
Association football defenders
Japan Football League players
J3 League players
Sagawa Shiga FC players
Ococias Kyoto AC players
FC Ganju Iwate players
ReinMeer Aomori players
Nara Club players
Vanraure Hachinohe players